Samuel Bhend (1943 – 2 December 2021) was a Swiss politician.

Biography
Bhend was born in Brienz in 1943 and grew up in Beatenberg. After graduating from secondary school, he became a teacher and subsequently a principal in Urtenen-Schönbühl. He was married to Lotti Bhend-Reber. Samuel Bhend died on 2 December 2021 at the age of 78.

Political career
Bhend was a member of the Social Democratic Party of Switzerland (PS) and was part of the ecological faction of the party. He was a communal councilor in Urtenen-Schönbühl from 1976 to 1982. He served in the Grand Council of Bern from 1974 to 1986 and again from 1990 to 1997. He served as Vice-President of the inquiry on the issue of Jura separatism in the mid-1980s. He chaired the PS in the Bernese Oberland from 1985 to 1992. He ran for a seat in the Federal Assembly three times, without success.

He became head of the Public Health and Welfare Department on 1 May 1997. He was re-elected in 1998 and 2002. In 2005, he announced that he would not be running for a fourth term.

References

1943 births
2021 deaths
People from Brienz
Social Democratic Party of Switzerland politicians